Cephalosilurus is a small genus of catfishes (order Siluriformes) of the family Pseudopimelodidae.

Species
There are currently four recognized species in this genus:
 Cephalosilurus albomarginatus (Eigenmann, 1912)
 Cephalosilurus apurensis (Mees, 1978)
 Cephalosilurus fowleri Haseman, 1911
 Cephalosilurus nigricaudus (Mees, 1974)

Distribution
Cephalosilurus species originate from South America. C. albomarginatus is found in Tukeit, Guyana. C. apurensis is distributed in the Rio Arichuna, Apure, Venezuela. C. fowleri originates from the São Francisco River basin. C. nigricaudus is found in the Sipaliwini District of Suriname.

Description
Cephalosilurus species have a great range in size. C. albomarginatus reaches 8.5 centimetres (3.3 in) SL. C. apurensis grows to a length of 29 cm (11 in) SL. C. fowleri can grow to 40 cm (16 in) TL. C. nigricaudus reaches a length of 35 cm (14 in) TL.

Ecology
C. albomarginatus is known to occur over sand and gravel partially covered with mud, leaves and dead wood. C. nigricaudus occurs in pools and in the backwater of rapids and fast streams with sand, rocks, and decaying wood on the bottom; it is found together with Bryconops caudomaculatus, Characidium blennoides, Pimelodella cristata, Leporinus friderici and Astyanax meunieri.

In the aquarium
C. fowleri may be kept in the aquarium. This fish is an aggressive species and should be kept alone or with fish that are much larger than it. Though large, it is sedentary and does not require as much room as a similarly-sized active species of fish might. These fish should be fed sparingly and the aquarium kept clean.

References

 Ros, Christopher and Ros, Wolfgang (2007): "Cephalosilurus apurensis - Ein gefräßiger Lauerräuber, aber nicht ohne Charme", Datz 60 (5): 38-42. Full English version of this article ("Cephalosilurus apurensis, a voracious ambush-predator not without charm") on Planetcatfish and Scotcat. 
 Ros, Wolfgang (2008): Cephalosilurus nigricaudus und seine Abgrenzung zu Cephalosilurus apurensis, "Aquaristik Fachmaganzin & Aquarium heute" (AF) 40 (1), Nr. 199, 34-36. Full English version of this article ("Cephalosilurus nigricaudus and its similarity to C. apurensis") on Scotcat.
 Ros, Wolfgang (2008): "Besser als sein Ruf: Cephalosilurus fowleri", Online Aquarium-Magazin (OAM) 7/08: 3-7. English version of this article ("Better than its reputation, a look at Cephalosilurus fowleri") on Scotcat.

Pseudopimelodidae
Fish of South America
Catfish genera
Freshwater fish genera